Lalmohan Ganguly, alias Jatayu (also spelled Jotayu) is a fictional character in the Feluda stories written by Satyajit Ray. He writes pulp crime thrillers, but is quite weak and nervous in real life. He is fairly wealthy due to the immense sales of his books; he writes two books a year. His crime fiction stories have very interesting names, often characterised by alliterations like 'Sahara-ey Shiharan', 'Honduras-e Hahakar', 'Borneo-r Bibhishika', 'Durdharsh Dushman', 'Vancouver-er Vampire', 'Himalaye Hritkampo', 'Atlantic-er Atanka', 'Anobik Danob', 'Naroker Naam Karakoram', 'Bidghute Bodmash', 'Arokto Arab' etc. The names of several Feluda stories also exhibit this feature, for example 'Joto Kando Kathmandute', 'Gangtok e gondogol', 'Royal Bengal Rahasya', 'Robertson-er Ruby', 'Gosaipur Sargaram', 'Bombay-er Bombetey', 'Gorosthan e sabdhan', 'Kailash e kelenkari', 'Bhusworgo bhoyonkor', etc.  The detective of Jatayu's novel, Prakhar Rudra, is a character with incredible intellect and power. Lalmohan's grandfather gave his name "Sarbogya Gongopadhyay" but Lalmohan does not use that name.

Overview
He first meets Feluda in the story Sonar Kella (The Golden Fortress) and from then on he accompanies Feluda and Topshe on all their major adventures. He collects weapons but is often reluctant to use them. Weapons collected by him during different adventures include boomerang, kukri (knife), smoke bomb and even a pestle etc. His whole demeanour is of hilarity and he regularly provides the comic relief in the stories. He has a history with the villain Maganlal Meghraj who had a circus performer throw knives at him in Joi Baba Felunath (The Mystery of the Elephant God) and fed him the drug LSD in Jato Kando Kathmandutey (The Criminals of Kathmandu). The last time Jatayu met Meghraj was at Golapi Mukta Rahasya.

Though in the Feluda adventures his activities invoke quite an amount of comedy but this character is far from a typical comic relief. Rather he often epitomizes the habitual mentality of an average Bengali person,which though is present in Feluda but is admixtures with some other qualities very often lacked by common Bengalis. However,Jatayu's  qualities also improve with time and with his association with Feluda, gradually making him more knowledgeable,smart and intelligent. In the movie version (not in the original story) of the first story, Sonar Kella, the criminal Mandar Bose escapes due to the folly of Jatayu.  But in the later stories we find Jatayu being of great help to Feluda in his work. In a lot of stories,he is seen to deliver important clues, sometimes though unintentionally and often possess something which is of great help as a tool in the investigation. In "Sonar kella" (movie) he uttered "sonar pathorbati" (a Bengali phrase used to describe something practically impossible) but that immediately enlightened Feluda and he got his most necessary clue to ultimately solve the case.In ''Gorosthan e sabdhan', his prized possession of an antique repeater(watch) is used tactfully by Feluda to apprehend the culprits. In a number of stories he actively took part as the saviour when the sleuth (and all three of them) are cornered helplessly by antagonists. e.g.- in "Baksho Rohosyo", his timely use of the boomerang subdues Prabir and in " Tintorettor Jishu" he picks up a wooden box and successfully delivers a blow to a goon's head told knock him unconscious. He even interrogated the suspects as a proxy of Feluda in "Apsara theatre er mamla".

Jatayu is a fan of Baikuntha Mallick, a teacher in Athenaeum Institution, Kolkata, who is also a poet. Jatayu often recites his poems, which are also a source of comedy due to their peculiarity. Jatayu walks two miles daily to keep fit, refers to encyclopaedia for writing novels. He is a bachelor and owns three houses. He loves travelling.Rabi Ghosh also portrayed Jatayu in Gosainpur Sargaram.
'Jayatu Jatayu!' a book written by Shuvadip Adhikari is a compendium of facts on Jatayu. All the facts mentioned in the stories of Feluda are compiled in a single volume.

Characterization 
In the first two movies on Feluda , the character of Jatayu was played by eminent actor cum advocate Santosh Dutta, and due to his performance, Satyajit Ray's later stories on Feluda had Jatayu adapting himself to the looks and mannerisms of Santosh Dutta. Veteran actor Rabi Ghosh played the role in the telefilm Baksho Rohoshyo, while Anup Kumar was Jatayu in the telefilm Bosepukure Khunkharapi. Bombaiyer Bombete, Kailashey Kelenkari & Tintorettor Jishu saw Jatayu being played by Bibhu Bhattacharya. Mohan Agashe played Jatayu in Kissa Kathmandu Mein, in Hindi TV series Satyajit Ray Presents. In the 2020 web series Feluda Pherot,  Anirban Chakrabarti essayed the role.

References

Satyajit Ray
Fictional Indian people
Characters created by Satyajit Ray
Feluda (series)